The 1993 UEFA Cup Final was played on 5 May 1993 and 19 May 1993 between Juventus of Italy and Borussia Dortmund of Germany. Juventus won 3–1 and 3–0 to record a 6–1 aggregate victory, a record aggregate score for a UEFA Cup final. The fixture would be repeated in the 1997 Champions League Final, when the result would be reversed, with Dortmund running out victors the second time around. By then, three of Juventus' team (Kohler, Möller and Júlio César) had joined Dortmund.

Route to the final

Both finalists had defeated French clubs in their respective semi-finals: Dortmund narrowly beat AJ Auxerre on penalties following a 2–2 aggregate draw, while Juventus successfully saw off PSG 3–1 on aggregate.

Match details

First leg

Second leg

See also
1992–93 UEFA Cup
1997 UEFA Champions League Final – contested between same teams
Borussia Dortmund in European football
Juventus F.C. in European football

References

External links
RSSSF
1993 UEFA Cup Final at UEFA.com

2
Borussia Dortmund matches
Juventus F.C. matches
1993
International club association football competitions hosted by Italy
International club association football competitions hosted by Germany
1992–93 in German football
1992–93 in Italian football
Final
1990s in Turin
20th century in Dortmund
May 1993 sports events in Europe
1990s in North Rhine-Westphalia
Sports competitions in Dortmund
Sports competitions in Turin